Edouard "Ernest" Mottier (16 April 1891 –  13 August 1968) was a Swiss ice hockey player who competed in the 1924 Winter Olympics.

In 1924, he participated with the Swiss ice hockey team in the Winter Olympics tournament.

See also
List of Olympic men's ice hockey players for Switzerland

References

External links

1891 births
1968 deaths
Ice hockey players at the 1924 Winter Olympics
Olympic ice hockey players of Switzerland
People from Château-d'Œx
Sportspeople from the canton of Vaud